The National Youth Cup is a Taiwanese football competition run by the Chinese Taipei Football Association. Starting from 1996, it is one of three major youth football tournaments in Taiwan together with Highschool Football League and National High School Games. The competition is held in the end of the year, usually in September or October, and is divided into three groups: under-19 men, under-17 men, and under-19 women.

Since 2005, the top 4 teams of under-19 men group are granted to enter the next season of the Highschool Football League.

Men (under-19 and under-17)

Results

Performance by team

Women (under-19)

Results

Performance by team

See also
 Chinese Taipei Football Association
 Highschool Football League

References

Football competitions in Taiwan